Elections to the Wigan council were held on Thursday, 7 May 1992, with one third of the seats set for re-election. Before the election the Labour Party had successfully retained their seats in three by-elections for the wards of Aspull-Standish, Leigh Central and Norley. The two elections directly preceding 1992's were markedly poor in participation, in contrast this year all wards were fought with the Conservative's and Lib Dem's return to fighting over three quarters of the wards each. Despite this, the election obtained the indisputably worst turnout in the council's near-twenty-year history, at a meagre 23.6%, losing just shy of 12,000 votes from the previous election. The elections were fought one month after the 1992 general election with heavy implications on the results - the most obvious of which is the nationally defeated Labour's loss of 8,000 votes from one year before, and consequently obtaining their worst vote figure in sixteen years. Neither the Conservatives rise - nor the Lib Dem's loss - of around 2,000 each, were significantly removed from recent results or accounted for such a loss, suggesting the slump in turnout were mostly the part of dismayed Labour voters. Seat changes were restricted to two Lib Dems gains from Labour, with one in the Labour-Lib Dem battleground of Aspull-Standish, returning the balance of councillor's in the latter's favour by two to one, and regaining one of their losses in the favourable territory of Langtree.

Election result

This result had the following consequences for the total number of seats on the Council after the elections:

Ward results

References

1992 English local elections
1992
1990s in Greater Manchester